Microseris douglasii is a species of flowering plant in the family Asteraceae known by the common name Douglas' silverpuffs. It is native to western North America from Oregon and California to Baja California. It grows in several types of habitat, including grassland and vernal pools, and on soils containing clay and serpentine.

Description
Microseris douglasii is plant is variable in appearance. In general it is an annual herb growing 5 centimeters to over half a meter tall from a basal rosette of leaves; there is usually no true stem. Each leaf is up to 25 centimeters long and has edges which are smooth, toothed, or divided into many lobes.

The inflorescence is borne on an erect or curving peduncle arising from ground level. The flower head contains up to 200 white or yellow ray florets. The fruit is an achene with a brown to nearly black, sometimes speckled body up to a centimeter long. At the tip of the body is a large pappus made up of about five long, bristly, barbed scales.

See also
Microseris heterocarpa, thought to be a hybrid of this species

External links
Jepson Manual Treatment — Microseris douglasii
USDA Plants Profile
Flora of North America
Microseris douglasii — Photo gallery

douglasii
Flora of California
Flora of Baja California
Flora of Oregon
Flora of the Sierra Nevada (United States)
Natural history of the California chaparral and woodlands
Natural history of the California Coast Ranges
Natural history of the Central Valley (California)
Natural history of the Channel Islands of California
Natural history of the Peninsular Ranges
Natural history of the Santa Monica Mountains
Natural history of the Transverse Ranges
Flora without expected TNC conservation status